Anaesthetobrium is a genus of longhorn beetles of the subfamily Lamiinae, containing the following species:

 Anaesthetobrium fuscoflavum (Matsushita, 1933)
 Anaesthetobrium javanicum Breuning, 1957
 Anaesthetobrium lieuae Gressitt, 1942
 Anaesthetobrium luteipenne Pic, 1923

References

Desmiphorini
Cerambycidae genera